Dowlatabad (also Romanized as Dowlatābād; also known as Dowlatābād-e Korbāl and Dowlatabad Korbal) is a village in Band-e Amir Rural District, Zarqan District, Shiraz County, Fars Province, Iran. At the 2006 census, its population was 221, in 59 families.

References 

Populated places in Zarqan County